Ocampo  may refer to:

Places

Mexico 
 Ocampo Municipality (disambiguation)
 Ocampo, Chihuahua, a town
 Ocampo, Coahuila, a city
 Ocampo Flora and Fauna Protection Area, a protected area near Ocampo, Coahuila
 Ocampo, Guanajuato, a city
 Melchor Ocampo, State of Mexico
 Ocampo, Michoacán
 Melchor Ocampo, Nuevo León
 Ocampo, Tamaulipas
 Melchor Ocampo Municipality, Zacatecas

Elsewhere 
 Ocampo, Camarines Sur, Philippines, a municipality
 Ocampo Street, Manila, Philippines
Ocampo (crater), on Mars

People 
 Ocampo (surname)

See also 
 Villa Ocampo, San Isidro, Buenos Aires, Argentina, the former house of writer and intellectual Victoria Ocampo
 Ocampa, a fictional race of humanoids in the Star Trek universe